Mohamed Lamine Kourouma (born January 1, 1987 in Abidjan, Ivory Coast) is a professional footballer who currently plays for Hassania Agadir.

Career
Kourouma began his career with Jeunesse Club d'Abidjan and was scouted in 2006 from Sheffield United F.C., after playing in England in 2007 was loaned out to Chinese farmteam Chengdu Blades. After a short time with Chengdu Blades he has played for Hungarian club Ferencvarosi TC in the 2007/2008 Season and in 2008/09 season helped the NB II team gain promotion to the first division in Hungarian NB I. After the ending of his contract with  Sheffield United F.C. turned back to Africa and signed in summer 2009 with Maroccain club Hassania Agadir.

International career
Kourouma played in 2005 for Ivory Coast national football team B and has played in junior national teams of Ivory Coast.

References

Ivorian footballers
1987 births
Living people
Expatriate footballers in Hungary
Ivorian expatriate sportspeople in China
Expatriate footballers in Morocco
Ivorian expatriate sportspeople in Morocco
Sheffield United F.C. players
Footballers from Abidjan
Expatriate footballers in England
Ivorian expatriate sportspeople in England
Expatriate footballers in China
JC d'Abidjan players
Ferencvárosi TC footballers
Nemzeti Bajnokság I players
Ivorian expatriate sportspeople in Hungary
Hassania Agadir players
Association football midfielders